Aatos Abel Tapala (born 5 May 1940) is a Finnish actor, opera singer and, for a time, a soloist for the Finnish National Opera from 1965 to 1972. Tapala was born in Sauvo. In the course of his career, he has performed various roles in operas and musicals, including Tamino in Taikahuilu, Basilio in Figaron häät, Perämies in Lentävä hollantilainen, Aegisthus in Elektra, Maalari in Lulu, Šemeikka in Juha and Tony in West Side Story.

Biography 
Aatos Abel Tapala was born in Sauvo, Finland in the year of 1940.

Tapala spend a significant amount of time studying other artists such as Jorma Huttusen, Pekka Nuotion, Clemens Glettenbergin, Clemens Kaiser-Bremen and Gino Cittadini-Lauri. Tapala also spent time as an elementary schoolteacher.

Tapala was married to Tamara Lund from the year of 1966 until 1985 when they divorced. The couple had one child together.

Filmography 
 Rinnakkain (1968)
 Lumberjacking (1988)
 Risto Räppääjä ja liukas Lennart (2014)

References 

20th-century Finnish male opera singers
1940 births
Finnish male actors
People from Sauvo
Finnish tenors
Living people